Deokgasan may refer to:
 Deokgasan (Gangwon) in the city of Wonju, Gangwon-do in South Korea. 832 metres.
 Deokgasan (Goesan) in the county of Goesan, Chungcheongbuk-do. 858 metres.
 Deokgasan (North Chungcheong/North Gyeongsang) in the county of Goesan, Chungcheongbuk-do and the city of Sanju, Gyeongsanbuk-do. 707 metres.